Microcodon is a genus of plants in the family Campanulaceae. It contains four known species, all endemic to South Africa.

 Microcodon glomeratus A.DC. 1830
 Microcodon hispidulus (L.f.) Sond. in W.H.Harvey 1865
 Microcodon linearis (L.f.) H.Buek in C.F.Ecklon & K.L.P.Zeyher 1837
 Microcodon sparsiflorus A.DC. 1830

References

External links
 Cornell University, Diversity of Life photo, Microcodon glomeratum

Campanuloideae
Campanulaceae genera
Flora of South Africa